Vera Nikolaevna Kublanovskaya (née Totubalina; November 21, 1920 – February 21, 2012 ) was a Russian mathematician noted for her work on developing computational methods for solving spectral problems of algebra. She proposed the QR algorithm for computing eigenvalues and eigenvectors in 1961, which has been named as one of the ten most important algorithms of the twentieth century. This algorithm was proposed independently by the English computer scientist John G.F. Francis in 1959.

Early life 
Kublanovskaya was born in November 1920 in Krokhona, a village near Belozersk in Vologda Oblast, Russia. She was born in a farming and fishing family as one of nine siblings. She died at the age of 91 years old in February 2012.

Education 
Kublanovskaya started her tertiary education in 1939 at the Gertzen Pedagogical Institute in Leningrad. There, she was encouraged to pursue a career in mathematics. She moved on to study mathematics at Leningrad State University in 1945 and graduated in 1948. Following her graduation, she joined the Leningrad Branch of the Steklov Mathematical Institute of the USSR Academy of Sciences. She remained there for 64 years of her life. 

In 1955, she got a first doctorate degree on the application of analytic continuation to numeric methods. In 1972 she obtained a secondary doctorate on the use of orthogonal transformations to solve algebraic problems. 

Scientific works 
During her first PhD, she joined Leonid Kantorovich's group that was working on developing a universal computer language in the USSR. Her task was to select and classify matrix operations that are useful in numerical linear algebra. 

Her subsequent works have been foundational in furthering mathematical research and software development. She is mentioned in the Book of Proofs

Publications 

 On some algorithms for the solution of the complete eigenvalue problem 
 On a method of solving the complete eigenvalue problem for a degenerate matrix 
 Methods and algorithms of solving spectral problems for polynomial and rational matrices 
 To solving problems of algebra for two-parameter matrices. V 
 To solving problems of algebra for two-parameter matrices. IX

Notes

References
 .
 .
 .

External links 
MacTutor History of Mathematics biography 

Russian mathematicians
Women mathematicians
1920 births
2012 deaths
20th-century women scientists
Soviet mathematicians
Soviet women mathematicians